Kalayaan Broadcasting System, Inc. (KBSI) is a Philippine radio network. Its main headquarters is located at Damosa Bldg., J.P. Laurel Ave., Brgy. Lanang, Davao City. KBSI operates a number of stations across places in Mindanao under the Gold FM and Radyo Rapido brandings.

KBSI Stations

Radyo Rapido

Gold FM

Others

References

Radio stations in the Philippines
Philippine radio networks